Bothynotus pilosus  is a Palearctic species of true bug.

References

Miridae
Hemiptera of Europe
Insects described in 1852